Melrose High School is a public high school located in Memphis, Tennessee, in the Orange Mound area, serving 1557 students in grades 9–12. It is served by Shelby County Schools.

Athletics
The 2009–10 boys basketball team won the school's fourth state championship   Melrose's football teams were 1996 & 1998 state champions. In 2004 & 2005 the football program made back to back State Championships runs.

Championships by sport
Girls' Track - 2 (1983, 1984)
Girls' Basketball - 1 (1985)
Boys' Track - 2 (1965, 2003)
Boys' Basketball - 4 (1974, 1978, 1983, 2010)
Football - 5 (1985, 2004, 2005, 2008, 2009)

Notable alumni
 William Bedford, basketball player
 Graig Cooper, NFL running back
 Richard Cooper, NFL defensive tackle
 Larry Finch, basketball player
 Jacob Ford, NFL defensive end
 Chris Jones, NBA player
 Jemerrio Jones, NBA G Player, Wisconsin Herd
 Andre Lott, NFL safety
 Tony Madlock, college basketball coach
 Kindal Moorehead, NFL player, strength coach at University of Alabama
 Pat Neely, CEO of famous Neely's Bar-B-Que and Neely's Interstate Bar-B-Que
 Tony Pollard, NFL running back
 Larry Riley, Broadway, movie, and television actor
 Dewayne Robertson, NFL player 
 Ronnie Robinson, basketball player
 Bingo Smith, NBA player
 Rochelle Stevens, athlete, Olympic and world champion
 Adonis Thomas, professional basketball player
 Sam Walton, NFL tackle
 Barry Wilburn, NFL defensive back
 Ralph Wiley, journalist
 Cedrick Wilson, NFL player and Super Bowl champion
 Jerome Woods, NFL Pro Bowl safety

References

Public high schools in Tennessee
Schools in Memphis, Tennessee